Natalie Raquel Vinti Nuño (born January 2, 1988) is an American-born Mexican former international footballer. She played for San Diego Toreros in the NCAA Division I Women's Soccer Championship, and the Mexico national team. Mainly a centre-back, she can also operate as a midfielder.

Personal life
She currently is leading a successful career as a Professional Services Recruiter at
Fitbit

References

External links
FIFA profile
School profile

1988 births
Living people
American sportspeople of Mexican descent
American people of Italian descent
Citizens of Mexico through descent
Mexican people of American descent
Mexican people of Italian descent

Soccer players from San Diego
American women's soccer players
Mexican women's footballers
San Diego Toreros women's soccer players
Mexico women's international footballers
2011 FIFA Women's World Cup players
Women's association football defenders
Women's association football midfielders